Kuai may refer to:

Kuai (dish), a Chinese food dish
Kuai, a colloquial term for the Chinese yuan (currency unit) 
KuAI, Kuibyshev Aviation Institute in Russia
KUAI, a Radio station in the  United States on the Island of Kauai, Hawaii

See also

Kauai, Hawaii, U.S.
Quai
Kwai (disambiguation)